Nickel(II) sulfate, or just nickel sulfate, usually refers to the inorganic compound with the formula NiSO4(H2O)6. This highly soluble blue green coloured salt is a common source of the Ni2+ ion for electroplating.

Approximately 40,000 tonnes were produced in 2005. It is mainly used for electroplating of nickel.

Structures

At least seven sulfate salts of nickel(II) are known. These salts differ in terms of their hydration or crystal habit.

The common tetragonal hexahydrate crystallizes from aqueous solution between 30.7 and 53.8 °C. Below these temperatures, a heptahydrate crystallises, and above these temperatures an orthorhombic hexahydrate forms. The yellow anhydrous form, NiSO4, is a high melting solid that is rarely encountered in the laboratory. This material is produced by heating the hydrates above 330 °C. It decomposes at still higher temperatures to nickel oxide.

X-ray crystallography measurements show that NiSO4·6H2O consists of the octahedral  ions. These ions in turn are hydrogen bonded to sulfate ions. Dissolution of the salt in water gives solutions containing the aquo complex .

All nickel sulfates are paramagnetic.

Production, applications, and coordination chemistry
The salt is usually obtained as a by-product of copper refining. It is also produced by dissolution of nickel metal or nickel oxides in sulfuric acid.

Aqueous solutions of nickel sulfate reacts with sodium carbonate to precipitate nickel carbonate, a precursor to nickel-based catalysts and pigments. Addition of ammonium sulfate to concentrated aqueous solutions of nickel sulfate precipitates . This blue-coloured solid is analogous to Mohr's salt, .

Nickel sulfate is used in the laboratory. Columns used in polyhistidine-tagging, useful in biochemistry and molecular biology, are regenerated with nickel sulfate. Aqueous solutions of NiSO4·6H2O and related hydrates react with ammonia to give  and with ethylenediamine to give . The latter is occasionally used as a calibrant for magnetic susceptibility measurements because it has no tendency to hydrate.

Natural occurrence
Nickel sulfate occurs as the rare mineral retgersite, which is a hexahydrate. The second hexahydrate is known as nickelhexahydrite , which is the monoclinic dimorph of retgersite. The heptahydrate, which is relatively unstable in air, occurs as morenosite. The monohydrate occurs as the very rare mineral dwornikite .

Safety

In 2005–2006, nickel sulfate was the top allergen in patch tests (19.0%). Nickel sulfate is classified as a human carcinogen based on increased respiratory cancer risks observed in epidemiological studies of sulfidic ore refinery workers. In a 2-year inhalation study in F344 rats and B6C3F1 mice, there was no evidence of carcinogenic activity, although increased lung inflammations and bronchial lymph node hyperplasia were observed. These results strongly suggest that there is a threshold for the carcinogenicity of nickel sulfate via inhalation. In a 2-year study with daily oral administration of nickel sulfate hexahydrate to F344 rats, no evidence for increased carcinogenic activity was observed. The human and animal data consistently indicate a lack of carcinogenicity via the oral route of exposure and limit the carcinogenicity of nickel compounds to respiratory tumours after inhalation. Whether these effects are relevant to humans is unclear as epidemiological studies of highly exposed female workers have not shown adverse developmental toxicity effects.

References

External links

International Chemical Safety Card 0063

Nickel compounds
Sulfates
IARC Group 1 carcinogens